Bhedihari is a village in the Parsa District of the Narayani Zone, southern Nepal. At the time of the 2011 Nepal census it had a population of 5,772 people living in 846 individual households. There were 2,977 males and 2,795 females  at the time of census.

Formerly, Bhedihari was a village development committee (VDC), which were local-level administrative units. In 2017, the government of Nepal restructured local government in line with the 2015 constitution and VDCs were discontinued. It is currently a part of Kalikamai Rural Municipality.

References

Populated places in Parsa District